The Central Realty, Bond & Trust Company combined real estate investment with trust company business in the early 20th century. Once described as "the first large New York City real estate investment trust company", it was founded in 1899 by  Henry Morgenthau, who was its president. In addition to Morgenthau, the company's directors included former New York City mayor Hugh Grant.

The real estate purchases and sales alienated legitimate trust company business, however, so they were separated. In 1905 a merger of the Central Realty, Bond & Trust Company with the Lawyers' Title Insurance Company was approved by both, resulting in a new company called Lawyers' Title Insurance and Trust Company, which would eschew the real estate business. The officers and board of the new company were the same as that of the Lawyers' Title Insurance Company, with the addition of Henry Morgenthau, president of Central Realty, as a member of the board and of the finance committee. The real estate of Central Realty was to be acquired by a syndicate or corporation to be organized by Henry Morgenthau.

References

1899 establishments in New York City
1905 disestablishments in New York (state)